KKIN-FM (94.3 FM) is a Country music formatted broadcast radio station licensed to Aitkin, Minnesota, serving Aitkin and Aitkin County, Minnesota.  Established in 1972, KKIN-FM is owned and operated by Jimmy D. Birkemeyer's R & J Broadcasting.

History
KKIN-FM signed on January 3, 1972; later that year, the call letters were changed to KEZZ. The KKIN-FM call sign returned on August 16, 1996.

On September 16, 2016, Red Rock Radio announced that it would sell KKIN-FM to R & J Broadcasting as part of an eight station deal; the sale was completed on December 21, 2016.

Former Logo

Programming
KKIN-FM also airs local, state, and national sporting events, and has shows such as Community Connection on Weekday mornings.

References

External links
 

Radio stations in Minnesota
Classic country radio stations in the United States
Radio stations established in 1972
1972 establishments in Minnesota